Sickness may refer to:

 Disease
 Nausea
 Sickness behavior

Other uses
 The Sickness, 2000 album by Disturbed
 The Sickness (novel), 1999 book in the Animorphs series
 Corey Taylor, nicknamed "The Sickness", American heavy metal musician
 (sic)nesses, 2010 video album by Slipknot

See also
 Sick (disambiguation)
 Sicko (disambiguation)